Governor Alexander may refer to:

Archie Alexander (1888–1958), Governor of the United States Virgin Islands
Edward Bruce Alexander (1872–1955), Acting Governor of British Ceylon
George A. Alexander (1884–1969), Naval Governor of Guam
James Thomas Alexander (1888–1952), Naval Governor of Guam
Lamar Alexander (born 1940), Governor of Tennessee
Moses Alexander (1853–1932), Governor of Idaho
Nathaniel Alexander (governor) (1756–1808), Governor of North Carolina
William Alexander (the younger) (1600s–1638), Governor of Acadia
William Alexander, 1st Earl of Stirling (1560s–1640), Governor of Acadia